Cameron Matthew Fowler (born December 5, 1991) is a Canadian-born American professional ice hockey defenceman and an alternate captain for the Anaheim Ducks of the National Hockey League (NHL). He was selected 12th overall by the Ducks in the 2010 NHL Entry Draft and made his NHL debut that year.

A dual citizen, Fowler represents the United States internationally and won a gold medal as a member of the junior team at the 2010 World Junior Ice Hockey Championships. He was a member of the 2010 Windsor Spitfires team that won the Ontario Hockey League (OHL) championship, as well as the Memorial Cup.

Personal
Fowler was born in Windsor, Ontario, the son of Perry and Bridget Fowler. Perry was a native of Newfoundland and Labrador and Bridget is a native of Michigan, making Cam a dual citizen. An employee of the Ford Motor Company, Perry moved his family to Farmington Hills, Michigan, before Cam's second birthday. His younger sisters, Peyton and Emily, were both born in the U.S.

As a youth, Fowler played in the 2004 Quebec International Pee-Wee Hockey Tournament with the Detroit Honeybaked minor ice hockey team. Describing himself as being one of the weaker players on the team as a youth, Fowler's potential as a hockey player did not emerge until his teenage years.

Fowler attended Farmington High School, where he played baseball in addition to ice hockey. He also played travel baseball for the South Farmington Blues and had great potential to be a Division One College pitcher.

Fowler was recruited by numerous National Collegiate Athletic Association (NCAA) Division I schools from age 14. He signed a National Letter of Intent with the University of Notre Dame in November 2008 during the early signing period. The USA Hockey National Team Development Program (USNTDP) also recruited him to their organization.

Fowler is a fan of the Detroit Lions.

Playing career

Junior
The Ontario Hockey League (OHL)'s Kitchener Rangers drafted Fowler with their first pick in the 2007 OHL Priority Selection; however, given that he had already committed to Notre Dame and playing in the OHL would have cost him his eligibility to play in the NCAA, Fowler refused to sign with the Rangers and instead made a two-year commitment to play for the USNTDP. With the development team, he was a member of the gold medal-winning American team at the 2009 IIHF World U18 Championships, where was named the best defenseman of the tournament and an all-star.

The Rangers surrendered his OHL rights at about the same time Fowler was reconsidering his commitment to play in the NCAA. The Windsor Spitfires then selected him with their first pick in the 2008 Priority Selection, after which he broke his agreement with Notre Dame and agreed to play for Windsor in the 2009–10 season. Fowler made the decision with the belief that playing in the OHL would better prepare him for an NHL career. The decision upset University officials, who alleged he was paid "under the table" by the OHL. Notre Dame Fighting Irish ice hockey team head coach Jeff Jackson alleged that the Rangers had offered Fowler a package worth $500,000 to break his commitment with Notre Dame and believed that Windsor had also made a financial offer to lure him away from the school. Fowler denied the accusations, stating he was "completely honest" with both Notre Dame and the Kitchener Rangers.

Fowler joined the Spitfires in 2009 and emerged as one of the top offensive-defensemen in the league, scoring 55 points in 55 games. He added 14 points in the playoffs to help lead Windsor to its second consecutive J. Ross Robertson Cup championship. The Spitfires then won the 2010 Memorial Cup as Canadian Hockey League (CHL) champions. Fowler left the Spitfires briefly during the season to play with the U.S. at the 2010 World Junior Ice Hockey Championships, winning a gold medal after defeating Canada 6–5 in overtime in the championship game.

The NHL Central Scouting Bureau ranked Fowler as the fifth-best North American prospect for the 2010 NHL Entry Draft in their final update. He had dropped two places, having been ranked at number three, behind Taylor Hall and Tyler Seguin, for most of the season. He was described by the NHL Central Scouting Bureau as an offensive quarterback on the powerplay who relies on his skating and puck control. He has been compared to NHL defensemen Chris Pronger and Dion Phaneuf, but does not play the same physical style as the two. Despite these accolades, Fowler's draft night lasted longer than expected, as he dropped to 12th overall, selected by the Anaheim Ducks.

Professional

Fowler began the 2010–11 season on the Ducks' opening night lineup. He scored his first career NHL goal on October 17 against Phoenix Coyotes' goaltender Jason LaBarbera in a 3–2 win. Fowler was selected to the 2011 NHL All-Star Game as part of the rookie class. Fowler ended the season with ten goals and 40 points in 76 games.

Entering the final year of his entry-level contract, the Ducks signed Fowler to a five-year, $20 million contract extension on September 12, 2012. For the duration of the 2012–13 NHL lockout, Fowler played for Södertälje SK in Sweden. He re-joined the Ducks once the season began. In the shortened-season, he had one goal and 10 assists in 37 games. Fowler made his Stanley Cup playoff debut that spring. He and the Ducks lost in seven games to the Detroit Red Wings during the Western Conference Quarterfinals. Fowler had three assists.

On July 1, 2017, the Ducks signed Fowler to an eight-year, $52 million contract extension.

On November 4, 2018, Fowler scored his first career hat-trick in a 3–2 overtime win against the Columbus Blue Jackets. On November 12, in a game against the Nashville Predators, Fowler was hit in the face by the puck causing a fracture in his face. He was subsequently placed on injured reserve two days later as he required a surgery to repair the facial fracture.

International play

Fowler represented the United States at the 2008 World U-17 Hockey Challenge. The team was defeated by Canada Ontario in the finals. He was then a member of the gold medal-winning American team at the 2009 IIHF World U18 Championships, where was named the best defenseman of the tournament and an all-star.

Fowler played for the U.S. at the 2010 World Junior Ice Hockey Championships, winning a gold medal after defeating Canada 6–5 in overtime of the championship game.

He was selected by USA Hockey to represent the United States at the 2014 Winter Olympics in Sochi. He recorded one goal in six games.

Career statistics

Regular season and playoffs

International

Awards and honors

References

External links
 

1991 births
Living people
American men's ice hockey defensemen
Canadian emigrants to the United States
Anaheim Ducks draft picks
Anaheim Ducks players
Canadian people of American descent
Ice hockey players from Michigan
Ice hockey people from Ontario
Ice hockey players at the 2014 Winter Olympics
National Hockey League All-Stars
National Hockey League first-round draft picks
Olympic ice hockey players of the United States
People from Northville, Michigan
Södertälje SK players
Sportspeople from Windsor, Ontario
USA Hockey National Team Development Program players
Windsor Spitfires players